Gobio occitaniae is a species of gudgeon, a small freshwater fish in the family Cyprinidae. It is found in Mediterranean drainages to Mediterranean between Rhône and Pyrénées in Andorra, France, and Spain.

References

 

Gobio
Fish described in 2005
Taxa named by Maurice Kottelat
Freshwater fish of Europe